Donald Fareed is an Iranian-born American Christian televangelist and President of the non-profit organization Persian Ministries International, which was founded by him. Fareed is an ordained minister and founding pastor of the Bay Area Persian Churches of San Mateo and Santa Clara in California. The ministry's objectives include evangelising and spreading Christianity among the Iranian diaspora.

Background
Donald Fareed was born into a Shia Muslim family in Iran during the reign of Mohammad Reza Pahlavi, the last Shah of Iran. His family was very dysfunctional and his parents divorced when he was a child. In his website, Fareed claims that he was very outspoken as a youth and as a result, got into trouble with the Savak, which was the secret police apparatus of the Shah. He became disillusioned with orthodox Islam as a teenager and turned to Sufism.
However, he soon became dissatisfied by what he perceived as the "superstitious and complicated nature of Sufism" and rejected Islam completely. He became interested in Christianity in 1990 after having a chance encounter with three Christian pastors and a dream in which a vision of Jesus Christ appeared to him. He converted to Christianity a year later. His conversion would influence most of his family members to embrace Christianity as well.

Fareed is a strong advocate of democracy and Western secular ideals. He has partnered with Sattar Deldar, a pro-democracy Muslim television broadcasting executive, to promote democracy and regime change in Iran since 2001. Fareed has teamed up with Appadana International, Deldar's secular Muslim satellite television station and other stations to broadcast programs about not only Christianity but also secularism, democracy and religious freedom.

See also
List of former Muslims
List of converts to Christianity
Christianity in Iran

References
 Donald Fareed's testimony on the Persian ministries website

External links
 Persian Ministries website - Official website of Donald Fareed.

American former Shia Muslims
American Pentecostals
American television evangelists
Iranian emigrants to the United States
Iranian Pentecostals
Converts to Protestantism from Shia Islam
Living people
Iranian former Shia Muslims
Year of birth missing (living people)